Jeffrey Thomas Thacher (born December 23, 1967) is an American musician, best known as a member of the vocal group Rockapella.  A professional vocal percussionist (a practice also referred to as "mouth drumming" and related to the hip hop-derived beatboxing) and singer who emerged on the early contemporary a cappella scene in 1991, Jeff Thacher co-founded the Boston-based a cappella group Five O'Clock Shadow (aka FOCS) that year and went on to join Rockapella in 1993 as their full-time mouth-drummer. Thacher was a 1990 graduate of Berklee College of Music's Music Production & Engineering program, and afterward spent several years in television & radio production when not performing

Vocal percussion, as a full-time occupation amidst a band or ensemble, was a fairly new idea in 1991, and Thacher performed as a tenor in Five O'Clock Shadow when not mouth-drumming. At that time, Rockapella was halfway through their stint on the children's television geography gameshow Where in the World Is Carmen Sandiego? on PBS (1991–1996) and had created several albums for the Japan-only record label For Life Records, as well as a soundtrack album for the Carmen Sandiego show.  These albums had used individual computer-sequenced samples of mouth noises for their drum tracks.  Rockapella sought to translate this approach organically to their live shows via a human performer, and after a search, Thacher got the job.

Thacher's first concert with the group was on May 15, 1993, at the Berklee Performance Center, after which he began touring internationally with Rockapella, making his first CD appearance with them on the song "Big Wet Rag" from the Carmen Sandiego soundtrack sequel Carmen Sandiego: Out Of This World (1993). The first album to feature Jeff's distinctive sound throughout was Rockapella's first all-originals album, Vocobeat (1994), for the Japanese market. Rockapella were still a quartet during their television stint on Carmen Sandiego until the fifth and final season of the show (1995) when Thacher appeared with them for that season.

As the mid-1990s progressed, the terms "organic" and "imitative" began to be used to describe contrasting a cappella vocal percussion styles, with Thacher as the most prominent progenitor of the "organic" approach, combining blatantly literal replication of drums with sounds that didn't seek to duplicate, but rather fill the role of a drum or percussive instrument. Thacher was also the first vocal percussionist to employ a throat microphone (aka "throat mic") using electronic guitar pickups adhered to the larynx area of the throat (see piezoelectric sensor).  The technique allowed intentional throat grunting sounds to be heard more effectively in live shows and on recordings (1997). He became the first such artist to be professionally endorsed by a guitar pickup company (Seymour Duncan, from 1998 to present, now D-TAR).

Thacher continues to tour actively within Rockapella, including multiple featured guest performer engagements with the Boston Pops Orchestra, as well as in various media outlets around the US and abroad.

Thacher has also been an independent recording engineer, mix engineer, and mastering engineer, as well as music producer since 1995, working constantly with numerous a cappella groups and singer-songwriters.  He works occasionally as writer/performer on television promo spots, including Nickelodeon's "Big Summer Movies" (2006) and holiday news promos for WPIX in New York, and directs & edits video productions. His work as a graphic artist can be seen throughout the artwork of his clients and collaborators.

Recent client music & video productions include:

• "Rock Around The Clock/Tell Me Something Good" for Rockapella released simultaneously as a video and single.  The video is shot in and around Reno, Nevada. Thacher is credited as video director & editor, and music mix engineer, and appears on-camera as the group's vocal percussionist.

• "They Tried To Kill Us (We Survived, Let's Eat!)" for the singer-songwriter/comedian – and co-founder of Rockapella – Sean Altman. Thacher is credited as video writer, director & editor.

• "Christown" for the gospel singer-songwriter – and former Rockapella member – John K. Brown. Thacher is credited as video director & editor.

• "Wake Me Up (Mimamakim)" for Pella Productions, which is an a cappella sound-alike mashup recording of Avicii's pop song "Wake Me Up", and Idan Raichel's "Mimamakim".  Thacher is credited as recording, mix, and mastering engineer.

• "4U4Now4Life" for Rockapella from their album, Bang.  The video is shot on the streets of Tokyo, Japan. Thacher is credited as video director & editor, and appears on-camera as the group's vocal percussionist.

• "Taller Than Jesus" for the singer-songwriter/comedian – and co-founder of Rockapella – Sean Altman. Thacher is credited as video writer, director & editor, and appears on-camera briefly from behind.

• "Pretty Much You" for Rockapella from their album Motown & More.  Thacher is credited as video director & editor, and appears on-camera as the group's vocal percussionist.

• "8 Nights Of Hanukkah" for Pella Productions, which is an a cappella sound-alike mashup recording of Fun's pop song "Some Nights", Adam Sandler's humorous "Hanukkah Song", and more traditional Jewish songs.  Thacher is credited as recording, mix, and mastering engineer.

• "Carmen Sandiego theme song Vs. Number One Hits!" for singer-songwriter/comedian – and Rockapella co-founder – Sean Altman. Thacher is credited as editor & co-producer.

• "Moves Like Moses" for Pella Productions, which is an a cappella sound-alike recording & music video of Maroon 5's pop song "Moves Like Jagger", featuring humorous original lyrics about bar mitzvahs.  Thacher is credited as video Director, recording & mix engineer, & music arranger.

• "Rewind" by indie teen pop singer Ali Brustofski, which was featured on TV promos for Nickelodeon's program, "iCarly" during the Kids Choice Awards and helped Brustofski win the Z100/State Farm "Hometown Hero" Competition. Thacher is credited as vocal arranger and recording engineer.

• "Holiday Party (Tonight Tonight)" for Pella Productions, which is an a cappella sound-alike recording of Hot Chelle Rae's pop song "Tonight Tonight", featuring original lyrics celebrating the Jewish holidays.  Hot Chelle Rae praised the song & video on their Twitter feed in December 2011. Thacher is credited as music mix engineer.

• "M.O.T. – Members Of The Tribe" for Simcha & Gorfinkel, a music humor duo composed of former Rockapella member Sean Altman and cartoonist & Jewish a cappella producer Jordan Gorfinkel. Thacher is credited as video Director.

Performer Discography

Domestic releases

International releases

Compilations

Unaffiliated releases

Miscellaneous releases

Solo/Other CDs As Guest Performer

References

External links 

Official Facebook artist page
Official Twitter artist feed
Official Rockapella website

Living people
American male musicians
American beatboxers
1967 births
Rockapella members